The molecular formula C17H19N5 (molar mass: 293.37 g/mol, exact mass: 293.1640 u) may refer to:

 ABT-724
 Anastrozole

Molecular formulas